Lamprosema distinctifascia is a moth in the family Crambidae. It was described by Rothschild in 1916. It is found in Papua New Guinea.

References

Moths described in 1916
Lamprosema
Moths of New Guinea